The Red Cloud United States Post Office, at 300 N. Webster in Red Cloud, Nebraska, was built in 1941 in Moderne style.

It includes three panels of mural artwork, painted on canvas by artist Archie Musick. The three panels, titled "Moving Westward," "Stockade Builders," and "Loading Cattle," depict the movement of Indian tribes to the west, the beginning of white settlement, and cowboys loading cattle into pens.

It was listed on the National Register of Historic Places in 1992 as U.S. Post Office-Red Cloud.  The listing included the building and three contributing objects.

References

External links

		
National Register of Historic Places in Webster County, Nebraska
Moderne architecture in the United States
Government buildings completed in 1941
1941 establishments in Nebraska